Anders Johan Norrback (born 14 September 1963 in Övermark) is a Finnish politician currently serving in the Parliament of Finland for the Swedish People's Party of Finland, representing the Vaasa constituency.

References

1963 births
Living people
People from Närpes
Swedish People's Party of Finland politicians
Members of the Parliament of Finland (2019–23)